Parawenzichthys is an extinct genus of protacanthopterygian fish containing the single species Parawenzichthys minor, known from the Turonian age Atlântida Formation in the Pelotas Basin in southern Brazil.

References

Further reading 
 

Argentiniformes
Monotypic fish genera
Prehistoric ray-finned fish genera
Cretaceous bony fish
Late Cretaceous animals of South America
Cretaceous Brazil
Fossils of Brazil
Fossil taxa described in 2012